"You Can't Run from Love" is a song co-written and recorded by American country music artist Eddie Rabbitt.  It was released in March 1983 as the second single from the album Radio Romance.  "You Can't Run from Love" was the follow-up to Rabbitt's duet with Crystal Gayle, "You and I".  (Coincidentally, a Crystal Gayle solo recording, "Our Love Is on the Faultline", preceded "You Can't Run From Love" in the number 1 position.)  The song was Rabbitt's twelfth number one single on the country chart.  The single went to number one for one week and spent a total of thirteen weeks on the country chart. "You Can't Run From Love" peaked at number fifty-five on the Hot 100 and number two on the Hot Adult Contemporary chart.  It was written by Rabbitt, Even Stevens and David Malloy.

Charts

Weekly charts

Year-end charts

References

Eddie Rabbitt songs
1983 singles
Songs written by Eddie Rabbitt
Songs written by David Malloy
Elektra Records singles
Songs written by Even Stevens (songwriter)
1982 songs